Group A of the 2011 Fed Cup Americas Zone Group I was one of two pools in the Asia/Oceania zone of the 2011 Fed Cup. Four teams competed in a round robin competition, with the top team and the bottom two teams proceeding to their respective sections of the play-offs: the top teams played for advancement to the World Group II Play-offs, while the bottom teams faced potential relegation to Group II.

Argentina vs. Bolivia

Paraguay vs. Peru

Argentina vs. Paraguay

Peru vs. Bolivia

Argentina vs. Peru

Paraguay vs. Bolivia

See also
 Fed Cup structure

References

External links
 Fed Cup website

2011 Fed Cup Americas Zone